Thomas Jones Howell (died 1858), who edited the 'State Trials' (vols. xxii. 1815-xxxiii. 1826), was admitted of Lincoln's Inn on 9 November 1814 (Register). He sold Prinknash after 1842. He died at Eaton Place West, London, on 4 June 1858 (Gent. Mag. 1858, ii. 93). He married twice (in 1817 and 1851). He was the son of Thomas Bayly Howell.

References

Frederic Boase. "Howell, Thomas Jones". Modern English Biography: A - H. Netherton and Worth. 1892. Page 1883.

1793 births
1858 deaths
Members of Lincoln's Inn